The  Philadelphia Eagles season was the franchise's 79th season in the National Football League, and the thirteenth under head coach Andy Reid. The Eagles had high hopes of competing for a Super Bowl with several notable offseason acquisitions – new backup quarterback Vince Young commented that the roster was a "dream team" – but ultimately failed to improve on their 10–6 record from 2010 and missed the playoffs for the first time since 2007. However, they did win their last four games, in an attempt to pull out a miracle playoff berth, finishing 8–8, only one game behind the divisional winners and eventual Super Bowl champions, the New York Giants. They also swept the Dallas Cowboys and Washington Redskins for the first time since 2006 and 2009, respectively. The Eagles played all their home games at Lincoln Financial Field in Philadelphia, Pennsylvania.

As of 2023, the only remaining member of the 2011 Philadelphia Eagles that has yet to retire or leave the team is Jason Kelce.

Offseason

Personnel changes
On January 15, defensive coordinator Sean McDermott was fired. Defensive line coach Rory Segrest was fired on January 16. Former Tennessee Titans' defensive line coach Jim Washburn was hired to the same position by the Eagles' on January 19. Special teams quality control coach Jeff Nixon was hired by the Miami Dolphins as their running backs coach on January 20. Defensive backs coach and senior assistant Dick Jauron was hired by the Cleveland Browns as their new defensive coordinator on January 21. On January 25, linebackers coach Bill Shuey, who served on the Eagles' coaching staff for the past ten seasons, was let go after his contract was not renewed. On February 2, Juan Castillo, who served as the team's offensive line coach since 1998, was named the new defensive coordinator. That same day, Howard Mudd was hired as the new offensive line coach. Quarterback Coach James Urban left to take a job as the Wide Receiver Coach for the Cincinnati Bengals.

Roster changes
The Eagles made several high-profile additions in the offseason, including Dominique Rodgers-Cromartie, Nnamdi Asomugha, Vince Young, Ronnie Brown, Evan Mathis, Steve Smith from the rival New York Giants, and Jason Babin. With the numerous signings in addition to the previous years' players, Young later enthusiastically commented during a training camp interview, calling the 2011 Eagles a "dream team".

Free agents

Signings

2011 draft

Player selections

Draft notes

Preseason

Schedule
The Eagles' preseason schedule was announced on April 12, 2011.

Roster changes

Signings
On July 29, the Eagles signed quarterback Vince Young, one day after he was released by the Tennessee Titans. That same day, the Eagles also signed former Oakland Raiders' cornerback Nnamdi Asomugha to a five-year contract.

Trades
On July 28, quarterback Kevin Kolb was traded to the Arizona Cardinals in exchange for cornerback Dominique Rodgers-Cromartie and a 2012 second-round draft selection. On August 1, defensive tackle Brodrick Bunkley was traded to the Denver Broncos in exchange for a 2013 draft selection.

Regular season

Schedule

Note: Intra-division opponents are in bold text.

Game summaries

Week 1: at St. Louis Rams

Week 2: at Atlanta Falcons

Week 3: vs. New York Giants

Week 4: vs. San Francisco 49ers

Week 5: at Buffalo Bills

Week 6: at Washington Redskins

Week 8: vs. Dallas Cowboys

Week 9: vs. Chicago Bears

Coming off their divisional win over the Cowboys, the Eagles stayed at home for a Week 9 Monday night duel with the Chicago Bears.  Philadelphia trailed early in the first quarter as Bears quarterback Jay Cutler completed a 5-yard touchdown pass to tight end Matt Spaeth.  Chicago would add onto their lead in the second quarter as kicker Robbie Gould booted a 51-yard field goal.  The Eagles answered with a 47-yard field goal from rookie kicker Alex Henery. followed by rookie linebacker Brian Rolle returning a fumble 22 yards for a touchdown, but the Bears would close out the half with running back Marion Barber getting a 2-yard touchdown run.

Philadelphia took the lead the third quarter with a 4-yard touchdown run from running back Ronnie Brown, followed by a 33-yard touchdown run from running back LeSean McCoy.  Chicago replied with Gould making a 38-yard field goal.  Afterwards, the Bears retook the lead with Cutler completing a 5-yard touchdown pass to wide receiver Earl Bennett, followed by Gould getting a 22-yard field goal.  The Eagles tried to rally, including an unsuccessful fake punt by Chas Henry, but Chicago's defense held on to preserve the win.

With the loss, Philadelphia fell to 3–5.

Week 10: vs. Arizona Cardinals

Week 11: at New York Giants

Week 12: vs. New England Patriots
The Eagles lost to the New England Patriots by a score of 38–20. Despite having a 7–0 lead to start the game, they were outscored by New England 38–13 to finish the game. During the third quarter, Eagles fans were heard booing on multiple occasions and chanting "Fire Andy" at one point. With the loss, the Eagles dropped to 4–7. They also fell to 1–5 at home and, dating back to Week 16 of 2010, the Eagles have lost 8 of their last 9 home games.

Week 13: at Seattle Seahawks

Week 14: at Miami Dolphins

Week 15: vs. New York Jets

Week 16: at Dallas Cowboys
 With the win the Eagles improved to 7–8, and swept the season series of the Cowboys for the first time since 2006. However, they were eliminated from playoff contention thanks to the Giants' 29–14 victory over the Jets.

Week 17: vs. Washington Redskins
 With the win not only did the Eagles finished 8–8, but closed out the regular season winning the last 4 games (won last 3 games in 2007), while also sweeping the Redskins for the first time since 2009.

Standings

Staff

Final roster

Notes and references

Philadelphia
Philadelphia Eagles seasons
Philadelphia Eagles